The position of the Head of the Luhansk People's Republic is the highest office in the Luhansk People's Republic (LPR), a disputed Russian republic since 2022 and previously a de facto independent state. The powers of the LPR government decreased following the annexation of the region by Russia.

Elegibility 
The Head must be a citizen of Russia (previously of the LPR) residing in the republic who does not have foreign citizenship, is 30 years old or older and is not disqualified from voting. Furthermore, he or she must recuse themselves from any public associations or positions in state and public structures, or business entities. 

There is a limit of two consecutive terms, but no limit for non-consecutive terms.

List

Head of the Luhansk People's Republic (as a de facto independent state)

Head of the Luhansk People's Republic (as a disputed Russian republic)

See also 
 Prime Minister of the Luhansk People's Republic

References

External links 
Russian republics

 
Politics of the Luhansk People's Republic
Lugansk